Francisco del Plano y García de la Cueva (1658 in Daroca – September 15, 1739 in Zaragoza) was a Spanish painter who was active in Navarra and the Basque Country.

Biography
Francisco del Plano was descended from a family of painters and gilders of Daroca.  Like his father, Ambrose of Plano, and his maternal grandfather, Juan Garcia de la Cueva, del Plano began as a gilder in the Guild of St. Luke.  He spent his youth in Zaragoza.

Francisco del Plano created frescoes of the Battle of Clavijo in 1723 at the Santiago de Zaragoza church. Later on, he worked with Miguel Jerónimo Lorieri and painted canvasses at the San Agustín (Saint Augustine) Chapel at the Salvador de Zaragoza Cathedral. He also carried out other paintings and murals in the Seo de Zaragoza, Olite, Corella and Viana.

References
Morales y Marín, José Luis, La pintura aragonesa en el siglo XVII (Aragonese Paintings in the 17th Century), Zaragoza, Guara, 1980, p. 104-106. 
La pintura del barroco en Euskal Herría. Arte local e importado . Fernando Tabar Ainitúa. BIBLID 1137-4403 (2000), 19 117–149, Universidad Complutense de Madrid
Palomino, Antonio (1988). El museo pictórico y escala óptica III. El parnaso español pintoresco laureado. Madrid, Aguilar S.A., p. 491. .
Francisco del Plano y García de la Cueva at the online Gran Enciclopedia Aragonesa (Great Aragonese Encyclopedia) 

1658 births
1739 deaths
17th-century Spanish painters
Spanish male painters
18th-century Spanish painters
18th-century Spanish male artists